Sunki is a village in the Koraput district of the Indian state of Odisha.

Location 
It is located at the border between Odisha's Koraput district and Vijayanagaram district, Andhra Pradesh and on the National Highway 43.

References

External links
 http://www.unicef.org/india/media_970.htm

Villages in Koraput district